Karls may refer to:

Surname
Karen Karls, American politician
Ken Karls (born 1947), Chairman of the North Dakota Republican Party 2003–2007
Tommy Karls (born 1961), Swedish sprint and marathon canoeist

Other
Karls robber frog (Eleutherodactylus karlschmidti), a possibly extinct Puerto Rican frog species
Kong Karls Land, island group in the Svalbard archipelago, in the Arctic Ocean

See also
KARL
Karl (disambiguation)
Karlsen (disambiguation)
Karlson (disambiguation)